XHTOT-FM is a  Mexican Spanish-language FM radio station that serves the Tampico, Tamaulipas market area.

History
XETOT-AM 1190 received its concession on November 7, 1986. It was owned by Radio Poderosa de Tamaulipas, S.A. de C.V., and broadcast from Tampico with 5,000 watts during the day and 500 at night. In 1999 and 2000, XETOT cut its daytime power to 2,000 watts and moved its transmitter across the state line to Pueblo Viejo, Veracruz. In 2010, it was approved to migrate to FM, and in 2015, XHTOT's concession transferred to OEM.

In April 2021, NTR acquired the ABC Radio network from OEM. On 2022, adopted the name "Radio Cañón", name used on old ABC Radio stations, based on XHTGO-FM.

External links

 oem.com.mx
 radiostationworld.com List of radio stations in Tamaulipas

References

Radio stations in Tampico